Agustín Alcántara Estrada (18 December 1946 – 25 February 1979) was a Mexican cyclist. He competed at the 1968 Summer Olympics and the 1972 Summer Olympics.

He died after competing in the 1979 Tour of Cuba.

References

External links
 

1946 births
1979 deaths
Mexican male cyclists
Olympic cyclists of Mexico
Cyclists at the 1968 Summer Olympics
Cyclists at the 1972 Summer Olympics
Pan American Games medalists in cycling
Pan American Games silver medalists for Mexico
Cyclists at the 1967 Pan American Games